Zabré is a department or commune of Boulgou Province in eastern Burkina Faso. Its capital is the town of Zabré. According to the 2019 census the department has a total population of 119,320.

Towns and villages

 Zabré (13 599 inhabitants) (capital)
 Bangou (2 130 inhabitants) 
 Barganse Peulh (353 inhabitants) 
 Barganse (93 inhabitants) 
 Bassintare (152 inhabitants) 
 Beka Zourma (559 inhabitants) 
 Beka (3 579 inhabitants) 
 Benya Kipala (1 445 inhabitants) 
 Benya-Peulh (369 inhabitants) 
 Bissaya (4 720 inhabitants) 
 Bougre De Youga (460 inhabitants) 
 Bougreboko (1 360 inhabitants) 
 Bourma (956 inhabitants) 
 Doun (1 538 inhabitants) 
 Gassougou (3 671 inhabitants) 
 Gon (810 inhabitants) 
 Gonse (313 inhabitants) 
 Gourgou-Samandi (251 inhabitants) 
 Guirmogo (2 290 inhabitants) 
 Mangagou (1 030 inhabitants) 
 Moende (750 inhabitants) 
 Sambaregou (619 inhabitants) 
 Sampema (8 284 inhabitants) 
 Sangou (2 954 inhabitants) 
 Sig-Noghin (429 inhabitants) 
 Sihoun (409 inhabitants) 
 Songo (1 003 inhabitants) 
 Soussoula (3 087 inhabitants) 
 Toubissa (1 109 inhabitants) 
 Wanda (1 389 inhabitants) 
 Wangala (2 506 inhabitants) 
 Wilgo (1 151 inhabitants) 
 Yokouma (139 inhabitants) 
 Yoroko (2 439 inhabitants) 
 Yoroko-Peulh (201 inhabitants) 
 Youga (1 018 inhabitants) 
 Youga-Peulh (534 inhabitants) 
 Youkouka (374 inhabitants) 
 Youngou (6 343 inhabitants) 
 Youngou-Peulh (201 inhabitants) 
 Zakare (375 inhabitants) 
 Zihoun (3 566 inhabitants) 
 Zourma (7 121 inhabitants)

References

Departments of Burkina Faso
Boulgou Province